Cawthra Park Secondary School, also known as CPSS, is a public high school built-in 1972 located in Southeast Mississauga, Ontario, Canada. It is one of two Regional Arts Schools in the Peel District School Board. Cawthra Park provides instruction to students from grades 9 to 12.

Cawthra Park offers a Regional Art Program, which Peel students may audition to attend. It also offers a mainstream option for locals students. CPSS is one of the few secondary schools in Mississauga with an active and operational public pool facility owned and operated by the City of Mississauga. However, starting in 2023, a new pool aquatic program and facility will open at the Carmen Corbasson Community Centre (on the same land of the school) and Cawthra Park Pool will be decommissioned. 

The Principal is Tyler McLeod, and the Vice Principals are Barbara Gordon and Nancy Gilliard.

Arts 
Cawthra Park is home to Peel's Regional Arts Program (RAP), for which students audition to study music (instrumental [concert band, guitar, and piano] or vocal), dance, dramatic arts or visual arts. Approximately two-thirds of Cawthra's students are in the RAP program, with the remaining students coming from the local area.

Cawthra offers a Specialist High-Skills Major (SHSM) in Arts & Culture, allowing students to complete additional certifications and training.

Academics 
Cawthra Park offers a full standard academic program.

In 2017–2018, the school exceeded provincial averages for both the EQAO and OSSLT test scores.

Music 
The music department has performed over the years at various venues, including mass at the Vatican City, onstage at Disney's Magic Kingdom, Austria, and for the former American ambassador to Canada, David Wilkins.

The music department runs many choral and instrumental ensembles. The Ritz, a concert choir with over 360 members, is the largest in North America. Current ensembles include Mississauga Transit, Jazz Lab, Guitar Ensemble, and the Intermediate and Senior Concert Bands.

In May and June 2013, the Cawthra Park Chamber Choir performed with The Rolling Stones in the Air Canada Centre.

Every ensemble has achieved gold status at MusicFest, and has received awards at National competitions.

Dramatic Arts 
Cawthra's drama facilities include three studios and an auditorium that seats 667. Approximately sixty drama students are accepted per year. The program introduces its students to aspects of theatre including theatre production, musical theatre, and set and costume design.

The drama department produces the school's spring play and monitors the school's annual participation in the National Theatre School Drama Festival. The department also shares directorial responsibilities with its music and dance counterparts for the fall musical.

Visual Arts 
The Visual Arts Department offers courses to students both in the art program as well as to students pursuing other disciplines. Courses include traditional, modern and post-modern art, desktop design, media arts and photography. The department also has ties to other departments at Cawthra Park such as fashion and communication technology.

During the annual Visual Arts SpringFest, the school is transformed into an art gallery. Senior Visual Arts students also partake in an art-focused week-long class trip to New York City.

Dance 
Dance forms that are studied include ballet, modern dance, musical theater and jazz. Students are also required to study a theoretical curriculum that includes the history of dance, kinesiology, composition, criticism and social issues relating to the dance community such as eating disorders, and arthritis. The department also offers elective dance courses for students not enrolled in the dance program, and dance opportunities for all students regardless of their arts discipline. Major events for the Dance Department include Dance Springfest in early April and Dance Mosaix in late May.

Productions 

The school also puts on a fall musical and a spring play annually.

° = These musicals were performed by the Clarkson Musical Theatre at the school in spring (and not students) before the tradition of the spring play came into place.

∆ = The school choose to delegate the fall spot to the Clarkson Music Theatre for their musical so they could instead prepare the school's first attempt at a spring play.

The above list was compiled by Daniel Lis ('14) by collecting information from yearbooks available in the school's library.

Athletics 

Athletic courses as of the 2015–2016 school year include both boys and girls basketball, golf, swimming, alpine skiing, volleyball, table tennis, badminton, ultimate frisbee, soccer, tennis, hockey, cross country, track & field teams,  and a boys' baseball team.

The 2012 Cawthra Panthers Ultimate Frisbee team in their second season reached the ROPSSAA finals, placing second to John Cabot SS

Notable alumni 

 Erica Peck, lead role in the musical We Will Rock You in Toronto and a Broadway performer
 Daria Werbowy, supermodel
André Dae Kim, actor, Degrassi: The Next Generation, Vampire Academy (TV series)
 Wali Shah, singer-songwriter, educational speaker, United Way ambassador and honouree of Canada's Top 20 Under 20
 Sebastien Grainger, singer-songwriter, Death from Above 1979
 Blake McGrath, singer, dancer, star of Dancelife, finalist on So You Think You Can Dance (season 1)
 Deanna Casaluce, actor, Degrassi: The Next Generation
 Adamo Ruggiero, actor, Degrassi: The Next Generation
 Amanda Stepto, actor, Degrassi (1987-1991, 2001-2009)
 David Bryant, guitarist for Godspeed You! Black Emperor
 The FemBots, musicians
 Drew McCreadie, winner of Best Male Improvisor in Canada at the Canadian Comedy Awards.
 J.D Fortune, Former Replacement INXS Lead Singer
 Lorne Ryder, Singer/Songwriter – CCMA and Canadian Smooth Jazz Award Nominee
 Dan Griffin, Vocalist/Guitarist/Keyboardist for the Arkells
 Dave Seglins, CBC News
 Marnie Woodrow, Author
 Sabrina Grdevich, Actor
 Julia Beauchamp, Figure skater
 Pooja Handa, CP24 Anchor
Boman Martinez-Reid, comedian

See also 
List of high schools in Ontario

References

External links 
www.cawthrapark.com

Peel District School Board
High schools in Mississauga
Educational institutions established in 1972
1972 establishments in Ontario
Art schools in Canada